Legendre, LeGendre or Le Gendre is a French surname. It may refer to:
 Adrien-Marie Legendre (1752–1833), French mathematician
 Associated Legendre polynomials
 Legendre's equation
 Legendre polynomials
 Legendre symbol
 Legendre transformation
 Legendre (crater), a lunar impact crater located near the eastern limb of the Moon
 26950 Legendre, a main-belt asteroid discovered on May 11, 1997
 Anne Legendre Armstrong (1927–2008), United States diplomat and politician
 Charles Le Gendre (1830–1899), French-born American general and diplomat
 François Legendre (1763–1853), surveyor, seigneur and political figure in Lower Canada
 Géraldine Legendre (born 1953), French-American cognitive scientist and linguist
 Gertrude Sanford Legendre (1902–2000), American socialite who served as a spy during World War II
 Jacques Legendre (disambiguation), several people
 Kevin Le Gendre, British journalist and broadcaster

 Louis Legendre (1752–1797), French politician of the Revolution period
 Louis Legendre (oceanographer), Canadian oceanographer
 Pierre Legendre (historian) (born 1930), French historian of law and psychoanalyst
 Pierre Legendre (ecologist), Canadian numerical ecologist
 Richard Legendre (born 1953), former professional tennis player and a Quebec politician
 Robert LeGendre (1898–1931), American athlete

Surnames of French origin